Gines Gonzalez (born 11 September 1938) is a French former footballer. He competed in the men's tournament at the 1960 Summer Olympics.

References

External links
 
 

1938 births
Living people
French footballers
Olympic footballers of France
Footballers at the 1960 Summer Olympics
Footballers from Saint-Étienne
Association football defenders
AS Saint-Étienne players
RC Strasbourg Alsace players